The 1868 United States presidential election in South Carolina took place on November 3, 1868, as part of the 1868 United States presidential election. Voters chose 6 representatives, or electors to the Electoral College, who voted for president and vice president. This would be the first time in South Carolina's history where the popular vote was used in the state during the presidential election, with previous elections having used the state legislature.

South Carolina voted for  the Republican nominee, General Ulysses S. Grant, over the Democratic nominee, former Governor of New York Horatio Seymour. Grant won the state by a margin of 15.86%.

Results

References

South Carolina
1868
1868 South Carolina elections